Tropical Storm Nakri, known in the Philippines as Tropical Storm Inday, was a large, long-lived, and slow-moving tropical cyclone that produced prolific rains over Japan and South Korea in early August 2014.

Meteorological history

On July 28, the JMA and the PAGASA started to track a tropical depression well east of the Babuyan Islands, with PAGASA naming it as Inday. Gradually intensifying, the JMA upgraded the system to Tropical Storm Nakri the next day. After passing through the Ryukyu Islands, on July 31, Nakri further deepened into a severe tropical storm. The JTWC, although, had only classified this as a "monsoonal disturbance" with winds packing at 40 knots. As Nakri neared the Korean Peninsula, the JTWC had begun warning on the system, although the JMA had already downgraded it to a tropical storm. Six hours later, the JTWC downgraded the system to a depression and stopped warning on Nakri. The JMA continued tracking the system as a tropical depression until it dissipated on August 4.

Preparations

China
As the storm moved over the East China Sea on July 31, alerts were raised for fishermen off the coast of East China. Strong winds and heavy rains were forecast for Zhejiang Province. Throughout the Shanghai region, precautionary steps were taken by local authorities to ensure the safety of residents. Flood control personnel were placed on alert and safety examinations of construction sites were conducted. High-speed rail service was suspended from August 1–3 around Beijing.

Japan
On July 31, several flights to and from Naha Airport in Okinawa Prefecture and ferry service between local islands were canceled. China Airlines flights from Taiwan to Okinawa were also canceled for August 1.

South Korea
Residents across South Korea received word of the impending effects of Tropical Storm Nakri on July 31. Meteorologists advised of heavy rain and strong winds for the majority of the country as the storm approached. The storm prompted cancellations of 236 flights at Jeju International Airport. By August 2, typhoon alerts were raised across the whole of South Korea; these were later discontinued on August 4.

Impact
In late July, heavy rains from the incipient low to Nakri extended over the southern Philippines. Hardest hit was Misamis Oriental province on Mindanao where flooding and strong winds damaged crops and homes. Agricultural losses in the province reached 5.13 million pesos (US$117,000); 374 homes were affected by flooding in the area. Evacuations took place in Claveria and Jasaan due to swift currents along a rising river. Approximately 70 million pesos (US$1.6 million) was allocated for relief efforts.

Japan

The greatest total was in Kochi Prefecture where  was measured in Kami, Kōchi. Several cities reported all-time record rainfalls from the storm, including Anan and Sakawa. The Yoshino River overtopped its banks and inundated 247 homes in Tokushima Prefecture; the resulting floods killed one person and injured two others. An estimated 540,000 residents were advised to evacuate due to the risk of landslides and further flooding across Kochi Prefecture.

Landslides in a remote area of Kochi Prefecture stranded 78 children on a camping trip.

In Yamakita, Kanagawa, the normally shallow Nakagawa River abruptly rose to  following heavy rains; three people were killed when their car was overwhelmed by the rising water. In Anan, a landslide at a parking lot killed one person while another landslide in Iwakuni, Yamaguchi killed a man in his home.

South Korea
On August 3 alone,  fell on the island, comparable to the average rainfall which the area sees during the entire year. These rains triggered widespread flooding across the nation. In Cheongdo County, seven died in a flood-related accident in Cheongdo Valley when their vehicle was swept away. 

In Seogwipo, a man was hospitalized after the windows of his home shattered. Approximately 1,600 residences briefly lost power on August 2 on the island. Throughout southwestern areas of the country, gale-force winds downed trees, power lines, and damaged buildings. Portions of a baseball stadium's roof in Gwangju was torn off and scattered across a nearby highway. In North Gyeongsang Province, a tree fell on several people at a camping site, killing two and injuring two others. Airborne debris killed one person in South Jeolla Province.

Aftermath

Japan

The torrential rains from Nakri and the subsequent Typhoon Halong resulted in Kōchi Prefecture seeing its wettest month on record. Some areas in the prefecture received more than  during August. The tremendous rainfall left soil overly saturated and on August 20, a heavy thunderstorm triggered a series of devastating landslides near Hiroshima. The disaster killed 74 people and injured 44 others.

See also

2014 Pacific typhoon season
List of wettest tropical cyclones in South Korea
Typhoon Halong (2014)
Typhoon Rusa

References

External links

2014 Pacific typhoon season
2014 disasters in the Philippines
2014 in Japan
2014 in Korea
2014 disasters in China
Nakri